A green wave occurs when a series of traffic lights (usually three or more) are coordinated to allow continuous traffic flow over several intersections in one main direction.

Any vehicle traveling along with the green wave (at an approximate speed decided upon by the traffic engineers) will see a progressive cascade of green lights, and not have to stop at intersections. This allows higher traffic loads, and reduces noise and energy use (because less acceleration and braking is needed). In practical use, only a group of cars (known as a "platoon", the size of which is defined by the signal times) can use the green wave before the time band is interrupted to give way to other traffic flows.

The coordination of the signals is sometimes done dynamically, according to sensor data of currently existing traffic flows - otherwise it is done statically, by the use of timers. Under certain circumstances, green waves can be interwoven with each other, but this increases their complexity and reduces usability, so in conventional set-ups only the roads and directions with the heaviest loads get this preferential treatment.

In 2011, a study modeled the implementation of green waves during the night in a busy Manchester suburb (Chorlton-cum-Hardy) using S-Paramics microsimulation and the AIRE emissions module. The results showed using green wave signal setups on a network have the potential to:

 Reduce CO2, NOx and PM10 emissions from traffic.
 Reduce fuel consumption of vehicles.
 Be used on roads that intersect with other green waves.
 Reduce the time cars wait at side roads.
 Give pedestrians more time to cross at crossings and help them to cross streets as vehicles travel in platoons 
 Control the speed of traffic in urban areas.
 Reduce component wear of vehicles and indirect energy consumption through their manufacture 

A green wave in both directions may be possible with different speed recommendations for each direction, otherwise traffic coming from one direction may reach the traffic light faster than from the other direction if the distance from the previous traffic light is not mathematically a multiple of the opposite direction. Alternatively a dual carriageway may be suitable for green waves in both directions if there is sufficient space in the central reservation to allow pedestrians to wait and separate pedestrian crossing stages for each side of the road.

Green waves are sometimes used to facilitate bicycle traffic. Copenhagen, Amsterdam, San Francisco, and other cities may synchronize traffic signals to provide a green light for a flow of cyclists. On San Francisco's Valencia Street, the signals were retimed in early 2009 to provide a green wave in both directions, possibly the first street in the world with a two-way green wave for cyclists. In Copenhagen, a green wave on the arterial street Nørrebrogade facilitates 30,000 cyclists to maintain a 12 mph (19.3 km/h) speed for 2.5 kilometers. In Amsterdam, cyclists riding at a speed of 15 to 18 km/h will be able to travel without being stopped by a red signal. Tests show that public transport can benefit as well and cars may travel slightly slower.

In Vienna, Austria a stretch of cycle path on Lassellestrasse in the 2nd district has a display that tells cyclists their speed and the speed they must maintain to make the next green light.

Frederiksberg, a part of Copenhagen, the capital of Denmark, has implemented a green wave for emergency vehicles to improve the public services.

In the UK, in 2009, it was revealed that the Department for Transport had previously discouraged green waves as they reduced fuel usage, and thus less revenue was raised from fuel taxes. Despite this government Webtag documents were only updated in 2011. It is still unclear if the economic appraisal software used to apply these guidelines has also been updated and if the new guidelines are being applied to new projects.

In a more limited sense, the term Green wave has also been applied to railroad travel. For several years starting in the 1960s, the German Federal Railway maintained an advertising campaign featuring the slogan garantiert grüne Welle (Guaranteed Green Wave), which communicated the notion of speed, limited delays and open track blocks to potential customers choosing between train and automobile travel, and was featured prominently in promotional materials ranging from posters to radio jingles.

See also 
 Bus priority signal
 Fundamental diagram of traffic flow
 Road traffic control
 Traffic wave
 Michigan Left

References

External links 
 http://www.accesstoenergy.com/view/atearchive/s76a4022.htm
http://www.ivv.tuwien.ac.at/fileadmin/mediapool-verkehrsplanung/Diverse/Lehre/RingVO_2014/2014-03-31_Felix-Beyer.pdf
 http://www.onemotoring.com.sg/publish/onemotoring/en/on_the_roads/traffic_management/intelligent_transport_systems/glide.html
 https://web.archive.org/web/20080613190052/http://www.bathnes.gov.uk/BathNES/transportandstreets/roadshighwaysandpavements/lightingtrafficlights/UrbanTrafficManagementControl/default.htm
 http://www.yairharel.com/2010/07/20/how-to-surf-the-green-wave
 http://www.sciencenews.org/view/generic/id/63481/title/To_tame_traffic,_go_with_the_flow
 http://www.sacs.dk/

Traffic signals
Waves